Barberville is an unincorporated community in Volusia County, Florida, United States, located at the intersection of State Road 40 and U.S. 17.

Barberville is the home of the former Barberville Central High School, which is on the grounds of the Pioneer Settlement for Creative Arts.

See also

References

External links

Unincorporated communities in Volusia County, Florida
Unincorporated communities in Florida